

Politics 
 Amalia Granata – Argentine politician and former model

Cinema 
 Mario Sábato  –  Argentine film director and screenwriter
 Claudia Conserva  –  Chilean actress, model and television presente

Arts and entertainment 
 Ernesto Sabato  –  Argentine novelist, essayist, painter and physicist
 Soledad Onetto  –  Chilean TV presenter

Models 
 Cecilia Bolocco  –  Chilean actress, TV Host and beauty queen who was crowned Miss Universo Chile 1987 and Miss Universe 1987
 Diana Bolocco  –  Chilean journalist, known as sister of Cecilia Bolocco, Miss Universe 1987
 Graciela Alfano  –  Argentine artist, model, actress and vedette
 Camila Barraza  –  Beauty pageant titleholder who won Miss Universe Kosovo 2016

Sports 
 Mateo Musacchio  –  Argentine footballer
 Tomás Guidara  –  Argentine professional footballer 
 Darío Benedetto  –  Argentine professional footballer who plays as a striker for Boca Juniors.
 Tatiana Búa  –  Argentine tennis player
 Fernando Belluschi  –  Argentine footballer
 Renato Malota  –  Albanian footballer
 Diego Albanese  –  former Argentine rugby union player

References 

South America